Vrbovce ( or Verbósz) is a village stretching out in the protected landscape area of the White Carpathians in Myjava District in the Trenčín Region of north-western Slovakia, on the border with the Czech Republic.

History
Vrbovce was mentioned in historical documents for the first time in 1394 when it belonged to the Branč castle. Since 1569 its owner was transferred gradually to the Amades, Hédervárys, Nyárys, Zichys families and others. The village was also granted town privileges which were destroyed in a fire in 1757. In 1810 the Vrbovce villagers were granted the right to hold markets.

Geography
The municipality lies at an altitude of 317 metres and covers an area of 51.520 km2. From the northern side the village cadastre is bounded with the state border and the border crossing with the Czech Republic.

Population
The people of Vrbovce mainly went in for agriculture, stock breeding, small trades and handicrafts (sack-making, basket-making, wood-making). The number of people: 1787 – 4493, 1900 – 3686, 2001 – 1620.

Tourism
A large square dominates to the village where a Roman Catholic church is situated from 1590. 
In the last few years the village has become well known to the wide surroundings by setting up so-called Vrbovčanská Room. If you want a spirit of an old Slovak ground floor house with rich furnishings wafting around you, visit it – you would never regret it. In the last years the tradition of organizing traditional St. Lucas markets (Saturday – market, Sunday – village fete) has been restored in the village, In the village environs there are excellent conditions for skiing, hiking and cycling. You can start or finish here a known cycle parth Vrbovce – Chvojnica – Havran – Častkov – Sobotište, Enthusiasts of technical monuments can visit water mill. The village offers boars and lodgings facilities.

Gallery

See also 
 Vrbové

References

External links

Vrbovce Official Site 
https://web.archive.org/web/20080111223415/http://www.statistics.sk/mosmis/eng/run.html 

Villages and municipalities in Myjava District